The Diocese of Odesa-Simferopol is a Latin Church ecclesiastical territory or diocese of the Catholic Church in southern Ukraine and Crimea. A significant part of the Latin Church in Ukraine, it covers an area equivalent to about one-third the size of Poland including areas impacted by 2014 Crimean crisis, and the 2014 pro-Russian unrest in Ukraine. Since 2014, there has been a de facto inter-state border that splits the diocese.

Bronislaw Bernacki is the current bishop of the diocese. He was appointed to the See of Odesa-Simferopol in May 2002 and is based in Odesa. Jacek Pyl is an auxiliary bishop and is based in Simferopol.

History
The history of the diocese begins in 2002, when the diocese of Odesa-Simferopol was erected from the Diocese of Kamyanets-Podilskyi. The diocese's "basic work" began about the time of the Fall of the Soviet Union in 1991.

Auxiliary bishop Pyl described the diocese in 2014 as “missionary territory” with “many challenges.” He reported that there were about 64 priests and 3,000 faithful in the diocese. In 2014, in Crimea there were seven parishes and 13 priests and masses were celebrated mainly in Russian but also in English, Spanish, Ukrainian, and Polish.

As of 2014, Simferopol does not have a co-cathedral. “We have been waiting for the last 20 years to get permission to build a church,” Bishop Pyl is quoted as saying. Plans for a co-cathedral had been underway but were put on hold following Russian annexation of Crimea.

Geography
The diocese is a suffragan of the Archdiocese of Lviv of the Latins.

Bishops
Bishop Bronislaw Bernacki (4 May 2002 – 18 February 2020)
Auxiliary Bishop Petro Herkulan Malchuk, O.F.M. (29 March 2008 – 15 June 2011)
Auxiliary Bishop Jacek Pyl, O.M.I. (23 November 2012 – )
Coadjutor Bishop Stanislav Shyrokoradiuk, O.F.M. (2 February 2019 – 18 February 2020)
Bishop Stanislav Shyrokoradiuk (18 February 2020 – present)

See also
Roman Catholicism in Ukraine

Footnotes

External links
 Diocesan website
 GCatholic.org
 Catholic Hierarchy

Odessa-Simferopol
Religion in Odesa
Religion in Crimea
Christian organizations established in 2002
Roman Catholic dioceses and prelatures established in the 21st century
2002 establishments in Ukraine